Shane Gericke is an American novelist living in Naperville, Illinois.  Before becoming a published thriller writer, he was a journalist, most recently at the Chicago Sun-Times from 1982 to 1994.

Gericke's novels
Gericke's first three novels star Naperville police officer Emily Thompson.  His most recent novel introduced Chicago police detective Sue Davis.

Emily Thompson novels
 Blown Away, 2006.  .
 Cut to the Bone, 2007. .
 Torn Apart, 2010.

Sue Davis novel
 The Fury, 2015.

Some Gericke bibliographies include a 1998 novel called Crusade.  This book was sold and assigned an ISBN, but the publisher went bankrupt before any copies were printed, and the book has never actually seen publication.

References 

American thriller writers
Living people
American male journalists
Writers from Naperville, Illinois
American male novelists
Novelists from Illinois
Year of birth missing (living people)